Eduardo “Duda” Pamplona (born 27 January 1978 in Rio de Janeiro) is a Brazilian auto racing driver. He competed in Stock Car Brasil from 2001 to 2013, resulting 6th in 2005 and 12th in 2007 with one win each season. Pamplona is an owner and driver of the Officer ProGP team.

References

External links

1978 births
Living people
Sportspeople from Rio de Janeiro (city)
Brazilian racing drivers
Stock Car Brasil drivers
Formula 3 Sudamericana drivers